Brossard is a suburb of Montreal, Quebec, Canada.

Brossard may also refer to:

 Brossard (surname)
 Sébastien de Brossard, French composer 
 Terminus Brossard-Panama (AMT), bus terminus in Brossard
 Brossard—La Prairie, Canadian federal electoral district
 Brossard-Mopin, French construction company active in the Far East from 1890s to 1940s.